Heterodera aucklandica  is a plant pathogenic nematode.

References 

aucklandica
Plant pathogenic nematodes
Nematodes described in 1995